Peter Kirby (died before October 13, 1788) was an early American pewtersmith active in New York City. 

Kirby married Margaret Ellison on December 24, 1736, in New York City; their son was William Kirby, also a pewtersmith. He was appointed in 1759-1760 as the city's Assessor of North Ward and in 1765-1776 as Tax Collector of North Ward. His work is collected in the Metropolitan Museum of Art.

References 
 The Bulletin of the Metropolitan Museum of Art, Volume 34, 1939.
 The American Heritage History of Colonial Antiques, Marshall B. Davidson, 1967, page 238.
 Pewter in America: Its Makers and Their Marks, Volume 3, Ledlie Irwin Laughlin, University of Virginia Press, 1965, page 105.
 "Old Pewter" in The Collectors Manual, N. Hudson Moore, March 1905, page 424.
 American Silversmiths entry

American metalsmiths